Clay County Historical Society Museum is a local history museum in a historic building in Liberty, Missouri. The museum building dates to 1865. It was a drug store and a doctor's office until 1963, when it was turned into a museum.

Exhibits
The Clay County Historical Museum houses art, antiques, and collector's items reflecting the early history of Clay County, Missouri. The exhibits are displayed in separate rooms, each named according to its contents. The main rooms are The Country School, Old Fashioned Parlor, Kitchen, Minerals, Gems, Library, Chapel, Musical Instruments, Military, Primitive, Bedroom, Clothing and Children's Toy Room. The museum also has a library, which has collections of newspaper files, area wide genealogies, area maps, reference books and microfilm.

According to the museum's website, "The main floor is divided by a glass partition with vintage display cases filled with china, toys, railroad artifacts and apothecary paraphernalia. Behind the partition the visitor will find letters by the Jesse James family; Civil War, WWI and WWII items; antiques quilts; and Native American artifacts."

References

External links
 Clay County Historical Society Museum

Museums in Clay County, Missouri
History museums in Missouri
1963 establishments in Missouri
Liberty, Missouri